Robert Burakovsky (born November 24, 1966) is a Swedish professional ice hockey coach and former player. He is the current head coach for the Malmö team in Sweden's U16 Elit league. Before turning to coaching, Burakovsky played 17 seasons of professional hockey, including 23 games in the National Hockey League (NHL) with the Ottawa Senators during the 1993–94 NHL season.

Playing career
He was drafted 217th overall by the New York Rangers in the 1985 NHL Entry Draft. He began his career in Sweden in 1985, playing in the Elitserien for Leksands IF until 1989 when he moved to AIK and then Malmö IF. He then made the move to North America when he was signed by the Ottawa Senators, but spent the majority of his spell playing for their American Hockey League affiliate the Prince Edward Island Senators and left after just one season.

Burakovsky moved to Austria to play to Klagenfurt AC for a season before returning to Malmö in 1995. In 1997 he moved to Germany to play in their top league, the Deutsche Eishockey Liga and played for the Kassel Huskies. Soon after he was off to Finland to play in the SM-liiga where he played for JYP and Ilves. In 1998, he signed with Swiss team SC Herisau and had his most productive year to date, scoring 38 goals and 70 points.

He later moved to HC Fribourg-Gottéron in Nationalliga A, where he led the team in points in the 1999–00 season with 49. He returned to the Elitserien in 2000 with a second spell with Leksands and a third spell in Malmö before another brief spell in Germany with the DEG Metro Stars. In 2002, he moved to the Oddset Ligaen in Denmark where he spent two seasons with Rødovre IK and then moved to Serie A in Italy, playing for HC Merano. His stay in Italy was a brief one however as he returned to Denmark in 2004 with Aalborg IK for two seasons, followed by a spell with the Herlev Hornets. He currently plays for EHC Biel in the Swiss second tier Nationalliga B having moved from IK Pantern in Sweden's third tier during the 2007–08 season. During late winter season 2009 he joined the team KRIF (Kallinge Ronneby IF). In 2012 Burakovsky retired from hockey.

Personal life

Burakovsky is Jewish, and his father, Benny, was an ice hockey coach. Robert's brother Mikael was also a professional ice hockey player, and Robert's son, André, was selected 23rd overall by the Washington Capitals in the 2013 NHL Entry Draft.

Career statistics

Regular season and playoffs

International

Awards and honors

See also
List of select Jewish ice hockey players

References

External links
 

1966 births
Living people
AaB Ishockey players
AIK IF players
DEG Metro Stars players
EHC Biel players
HC Fribourg-Gottéron players
HC Merano players
Herlev Hornets players
Ilves players
JYP Jyväskylä players
Kassel Huskies players
EC KAC players
Jewish ice hockey players
Leksands IF players
Malmö Redhawks players
New York Rangers draft picks
Ottawa Senators players
Prince Edward Island Senators players
Rødovre Mighty Bulls players
SC Herisau players
Sportspeople from Malmö
Swedish expatriate sportspeople in Austria
Swedish expatriate ice hockey players in Canada
Swedish expatriate ice hockey players in Denmark
Swedish expatriate ice hockey players in Finland
Swedish expatriate ice hockey players in Germany
Swedish expatriate sportspeople in Italy
Swedish expatriate sportspeople in Switzerland
Swedish ice hockey right wingers
Swedish people of Russian descent
Swedish people of Russian-Jewish descent